Howard Spodek (born c. 1941) is an American-born world historian, a professor of history and geography and urban studies at Temple University. He received a B.A. from Columbia University in 1963 and a Ph.D. from the University of Chicago in 1972; while a graduate student, he visited India as a Fulbright Fellow. He joined the Temple faculty in 1972. As well as his faculty position at Temple, Spodek is the treasurer of the World History Association and a member of the editorial board of History Compass.

Spodek specializes in Indian history, and in particular on the city of Ahmedabad. He is the author of The World's History, a college textbook that is sometimes also used for high school Advanced Placement history courses and that has gone through four editions. He won Temple's Great Teacher Award in 1993.

Spodek is a 1959 graduate of Taylor Allderdice High School in Pittsburgh, PA.

References

External links
Web site at Geography and Urban Studies, Temple

1940s births
Living people
World historians
21st-century American historians
21st-century American male writers
Columbia College (New York) alumni
University of Chicago alumni
Temple University faculty
American male non-fiction writers